1971–72 FIS Alpine Ski Europa Cup was the first season of the FIS Alpine Ski Europa Cup, eight to ten races per discipline were held for women and men. The final took place in Arosa in Switzerland. In contrast to the World Cup, the top 15 runners in each race received points according to the scheme 25-22-20-18-16-14-12-10-8-6-5-4-3-2-1.

Standings

Overall

Downhill

Giant Slalom

Slalom

References

External links
 

FIS Alpine Ski Europa Cup